Avante (Ao Vivo Em São Paulo) EP (English: Forward EP (Live In São Paulo) ) is an extended play (EP) of Brazilian singer Joelma released in order to support the release of Album of the same name. It was released on all digital platforms on April 14, 2017 by Universal Music. Voando pro Pará, 'Não Teve Amor, Chora Não Coração and #Partiu were the songs released.

In less than 24 hours, the EP was already in first place on iTunes.

Videos

The videos of the four songs were made available on the singer's official channel on YouTube the same day.

Track listing

References

2017 EPs
EPs by Brazilian artists
Joelma Mendes albums